The Canton of Abbeville-Nord  is a former canton situated in the department of the Somme and in the Picardy region of northern France. It was disbanded following the French canton reorganisation which came into effect in March 2015. It had 16,905 inhabitants (2012).

Geography 
The canton was organised around the commune of Abbeville in the arrondissement of Abbeville. The altitude varies from 2m at Drucat to 95m at Bellancourt.

The canton comprised 7 communes:
Abbeville (partly)
Bellancourt
Caours
Drucat
Grand-Laviers
Neufmoulin
Vauchelles-les-Quesnoy}

See also
 Arrondissements of the Somme department
 Cantons of the Somme department
 Communes of the Somme department

References

Abbeville-Nord
Abbeville
2015 disestablishments in France
States and territories disestablished in 2015